Help Wanted may refer to:

 Employment, traditionally offered by a "Help Wanted" sign or classified advertising

Books
 Help Wanted, a 1955 children's book featuring Donald Duck
 Help Wanted!, a 1988 children's novel in Girls of Canby Hall franchise by Emily Chase

Music
 Help Wanted (The Chi-Lites album), a 1998 album by The Chi-Lites
 Help Wanted (Eric Avery album), a 2008 debut solo album by Eric Avery
 "Help Wanted", a 1968 single by The Mirettes
 "Help Wanted", a 1979 single by Legs Diamond
 "Help Wanted", a song from the 1997 album Funcrusher Plus by Company Flow

Television episodes 
 "Help Wanted", a 1962 episode of The Hathaways
 "Help Wanted", a 1972 episode of Wait Till Your Father Gets Home
 Police Squad!: Help Wanted!, a 1985 Paramount Home Video volume of Police Squad! containing 3 episodes from the series
 "Help Wanted", a 1987 episode of Gung Ho
 "Help Wanted" (SpongeBob SquarePants), the 1999 pilot of SpongeBob SquarePants
 "Help Wanted" (Gilmore Girls), a 2002 episode of Gilmore Girls
 "Help Wanted", a 2007 episode of Aliens in America
 "Help Want-Ed", a 2008 episode of Best Ed
 "Help Wanted", a 2009 episode of Tyler Perry's House
 "Help Wanted", a 2012 episode of Pawn Stars

Other
 Help Wanted, a 1911 comedy silent film starring Joseph Graybill
 Help Wanted (1915 film), a 1915 American drama silent film
 "Help Wanted", a 2002 episode from the radio show This American Life
 Help Wanted (video game), a 2008 video game for the Wii

See also
 Help Wanted, Male, a 1945 novella in the Trouble in Triplicate mystery novel collection by Nero Wolfe
 "Help Wanted, Desperately", a 1967 episode of Please Don't Eat the Daisies
 "Help Wanted - Firefly", a 1970 episode of The Bugaloos
 "Help Wanted: Mommy", a 1986 episode of Alvin and the Chipmunks